Jennings Randolph (March 8, 1902May 8, 1998) was an American politician from West Virginia. A Democrat, he was most notable for his service in the United States House of Representatives from 1933 to 1947 and the United States Senate from 1958 to 1985. He was the last surviving member of the United States Congress to have served during the first 100 days of Franklin D. Roosevelt's administration. Randolph retired in 1985, and was succeeded by Jay Rockefeller.

Early life and career
Randolph was born in Salem, West Virginia, the son of Idell (Bingham) and Ernest Fitz Randolph. He was named after William Jennings Bryan. Both his grandfather and father had been mayors of Salem.

He attended the public schools, and graduated from the Salem Academy in 1920 and Salem College in 1922. He engaged in newspaper work in Clarksburg, West Virginia in 1924. He was the associate editor of West Virginia Review at Charleston, West Virginia in 1925; head of the department of public speaking and journalism at Davis and Elkins College at Elkins, West Virginia, 1926–1932; and a trustee of Salem College and Davis and Elkins College.

He was an unsuccessful candidate for election in 1930 to the Seventy-second Congress, but was elected to the Seventy-third and to the six succeeding Congresses, serving from March 4, 1933, to January 3, 1947. While a congressman, he was chairman of the U.S. House Committee on the District of Columbia (Seventy-sixth through Seventy-ninth Congresses) and the U.S. House Committee on Civil Service (Seventy-ninth Congress).

Randolph was an unsuccessful candidate for reelection during the Republican landslide of 1946. He went on to become a professor of public speaking at Southeastern University in Washington, D.C., 1935–1953, and dean of School of Business Administration from 1952 to 1958; he was assistant to president and director of public relations, Capital Airlines (later purchased by United Airlines), Washington, D.C., February 1947-April 1958.

U.S. Senate
He was elected in a special election on November 4, 1958 to the United States Senate to fill the vacancy triggered by the death of Matthew M. Neely.  He was reelected in 1960, 1966, 1972 and 1978, and served from November 5, 1958 to January 3, 1985. Randolph was chairman of the Committee on Public Works (89th through 95th Congresses) and its successor, the Committee on Environment and Public Works (95th and 96th Congresses).  He was not a candidate for reelection in 1984.

Legislation
Randolph voted in favor of the Civil Rights Acts of 1960, 1964, and 1968, as well as the 24th Amendment to the U.S. Constitution, the Voting Rights Act of 1965, and the confirmation of Thurgood Marshall to the U.S. Supreme Court. On November 4, 1977, President Jimmy Carter signed environmental bills H.R. 2817 and H.R. 4297, singling Randolph out as the sole senator he wanted to thank for their passage.

Twenty-Sixth Amendment to the United States Constitution

Randolph was best known for sponsoring eleven times an amendment to the Constitution that would grant citizens aged between 18 and 21 the right to vote. He first introduced the amendment in 1942, arguing that young soldiers fighting in World War II should be able to vote. In 1970 amendments to the Voting Rights Act lowered the voting age to 18 in both local and national elections. After the Supreme Court found in Oregon v. Mitchell that Congress only had the power to lower the voting age to 18 for national elections, and no power to lower it for state elections, Randolph was among the Senators who reintroduced the amendment. It was ratified by three-fourths of the states in 1971 as the Twenty-Sixth Amendment, 107 days after it was approved by Congress.

Equal Rights Amendment

On August 26, 1970, the fiftieth anniversary of the ratification of the Nineteenth Amendment to the United States Constitution giving women the right to vote, Randolph attracted widespread media coverage for negative comments he made concerning the Women's Liberation Movement. Feminists had organized a nationwide Women's Strike for Equality that day, and presented the sympathetic Senate leadership with a petition for the Equal Rights Amendment. Randolph derided the protesters as "braless bubbleheads" and claimed  that the equal rights activists did not speak for women, citing those more radical feminists that supported, as he put it, the "right to unabridged abortions". Randolph would later admit that his bubblehead comment was "perhaps ill-chosen" and went on to support the Equal Rights Amendment. In 1972, when the amendment passed the Senate, Randolph was a co-sponsor.

Randolph-Sheppard Act

While a member of the House of Representatives, Randolph was the main sponsor of the Randolph-Sheppard Act, which was passed by Congress in 1936. This act, which is still in force, gives blind people preference in federal contracts for food service stands on federal properties such as military bases, as well as some other jobs. Organizations for blind people such as the National Federation of the Blind cite this act as one of the first and most successful programs to give blind people secure jobs with less supervision and more independence than other previous programs such as sheltered workshops. This act became one of the first instances of affirmative action legislation.

Aeronautics Legislation

An aviation enthusiast, he often flew more than once a day to visit constituents in West Virginia and to commute to Washington. He was the founder and first president of the Congressional Flying Club. He was a strong advocate for programs to advance air travel and airport development. In 1938 he sponsored the Civil Aeronautics Act, which transferred the federal civil aviation responsibilities from the Department of Commerce to a new independent agency, the Civil Aeronautics Authority. The legislation gave the CAA the power to regulate airline fares and to determine the routes that air carriers would serve. In subsequent years, Randolph co-authored the Federal Airport Act as well as legislation that created the Civil Air Patrol, the National Air and Space Museum, and National Aviation Day. During his tenure in the Senate, he sponsored the Airport-Airways Development Act that created the Airport Trust Fund. As a co-author of the Appalachian Regional Development Act, he included provisions for the development of rural airports.

Synthetic Liquid Fuels Act

In 1942 he proposed a Synthetic Liquid Fuels Act, which would fund the transformation of coal and its products into other useful forms of energy. To promote the viability of synthetic fuels in November 1943, Randolph and a professional pilot flew in an aircraft powered by gasoline derived from coal. The small, single-engine airplane flew from Morgantown, West Virginia to National Airport in Washington, DC. Aided by Interior Secretary Harold Ickes and Senator Joseph C. O'Mahoney, the Synthetic Liquid Fuels Act was approved on 5 April 1944. The Act authorized $30 million for the construction and operation of demonstration plants to produce synthetic liquid fuels.

Department of Peace

He introduced legislation to establish a Department of Peace in 1946 with the goal of strengthening America's capacity to resolve and manage international conflicts by both military and nonmilitary means. In the 1970s and 1980s he joined Senators Mark Hatfield and Spark Matsunaga and Congressman Dan Glickman in efforts to create a national institution dedicated to peace. After he had announced his retirement from Congress in 1984, Randolph played a key role in the passage and enactment of the United States Institute of Peace Act. To guarantee its passage and funding, the legislation was attached to the Department of Defense Authorization Act of 1985. Approval of the legislation was in part a tribute to Randolph's long career in public service. The Jennings Randolph Program, which awards fellowships to enable outstanding scholars, policymakers, journalists, and other professionals from around the world to conduct research at the U.S. Institute of Peace, has been named in his honor.

Life outside Congress
 Randolph's early career is recounted in Napoleon Hill's self-help  book, Think and Grow Rich. Hill gave the commencement address at Randolph's graduation from Salem College; Randolph was deeply moved and inspired by the address. Later, when Randolph was elected to Congress, he wrote to Hill, urging him to turn the speech into a printed book. The text of the letter appears in the book.
 Randolph married Mary Katherine Babb on February 18, 1933. She died of cancer on March 10, 1981, and the Mary Babb Randolph Cancer Center at West Virginia University is named for her.
 Randolph died in St. Louis, Missouri in 1998. He was interred at Seventh Day Baptist Cemetery, Salem, West Virginia.
 Randolph wrote a book along with James A. Bell called "Mr. Chairman, Ladies and Gentlemen... : A Practical Guide to Public Speaking," which was published in 1939.
 Randolph's son, Jay Randolph, is a longtime television sportscaster for NBC, and KSDK for Cardinals' games in St. Louis.
 His grandson, Jay Randolph Jr., is the lead anchor of the PGA Tour Network on XM Satellite Radio, and hosts a sports talk show on St. Louis radio station KFNS.
 Jennings Randolph Lake is named in his honor. The Jennings Randolph Bridge that carries U.S. Route 30 across the Ohio River between Chester, West Virginia, and East Liverpool, Ohio, is also named for him. In West Virginia, Interstate 79 is known as the Jennings Randolph Expressway.
 Randolph was de facto chairman of Agri-Energy Roundtable (AER), a nongovernmental organization (NGO) accredited by the United Nations, and led U.S. delegations to seven AER annual conferences in Geneva, Switzerland (1981–1987).
 Randolph was the winner of the George S. Bartlett Award for road transportation in 1971.

References

Further reading
 Price, Christopher. "Peace and Progress: The Life and Political Contributions of Senator Jennings Randolph." West Virginia History 14.2 (2020): 1-27.

External links

 
 
 Jennings Randolph Recognition Project (JRRP)
 Jennings Randolph Collection
 

|-

|-

|-

|-

|-

|-

1902 births
1998 deaths
20th-century American educators
20th-century American politicians
Baptists from West Virginia
Candidates in the 1964 United States presidential election
Candidates in the 1976 United States presidential election
Candidates in the 1980 United States presidential election
Davis & Elkins College faculty
Davis & Elkins College trustees
Democratic Party members of the United States House of Representatives from West Virginia
Democratic Party United States senators from West Virginia
Editors of West Virginia newspapers
People from Salem, West Virginia
Jennings
Salem International University alumni
Salem University trustees
Seventh Day Baptists
Southeastern University (Washington, D.C.) faculty
Writers from West Virginia